The  Danjiang Bridge is an under-construction road and light rail bridge spanning the mouth of the Tamsui River, which will link Bali and Tamsui in New Taipei City, Taiwan.

The bridge was designed by architect Dame Zaha Hadid. When completed in 2024, the bridge will be the  longest single-tower, cable-stayed bridge in the world.

History
The bridge was commissioned by the Directorate General of Highways, and was designed to provide connection to the national highway system and to ease congestion on the Guandu Bridge that is situated further upstream. The construction of the bridge will also facilitate the expansion of the Danhai Light Rail, part of the city's light rail public transport system. Zaha Hadid Architects in collaboration with Sinotech Engineering Consultants and Leonhardt Andra und Partner Beratende Ingenieure have won an international competition to design the Danjiang Bridge.

See also
 Transportation in Taiwan

References

External links

Danjiang Bridge 
Bridge at Zaha Hadid Architects website
Danjiang Bridge International Competition website

Cable-stayed bridges in Taiwan
Bridges in New Taipei
Buildings and structures under construction in Taiwan
Proposed bridges in Asia
Road-rail bridges